The 2010 Beach Handball World Championships was a twelve-team tournament in both men's and women's beach handball, held at Antalya in Turkey from 23 June 2010 to 27 June 2010. It was the fourth edition of the event. Matches were played in sets, the team that wins two sets was the winner of a match. When teams are equal in points the head-to-head result was decisive.

Format
The twelve teams were split into two groups of six teams. After playing a round-robin, the three top-ranked teams advanced to the main round. Every team kept the points from preliminary round matches against teams who also advanced. In the main round every team had three games against the opponents they did not face in the preliminary round. The top four teams advanced to the semifinals. The three bottom-ranked teams from each preliminary round group were packed into one group. The points won against the teams who were also in this group would be valid. Every team had three games and after those rounds there were placement matches from 7th to 12th.

Men

Participating nations

Preliminary round

Group A

June 23, 2010

June 24, 2010

June 25, 2010

Group B

June 23, 2010

June 24, 2010

June 25, 2010

Main round (Group C)

June 25, 2010

June 26, 2010

Consolation round (Group D)

June 25, 2010

June 26, 2010

Placement matches
11th/12th position
June 27, 2010

9th/10th position
June 27, 2010

7th/8th position
June 27, 2010

5th/6th position
June 27, 2010

Finals

Semifinals
June 27, 2010

3rd/4th place
June 27, 2010

Final
June 27, 2010

Women

Participating nations

Preliminary round

Group A

June 23, 2010

June 24, 2010

June 25, 2010

Group B

June 23, 2010

June 24, 2010

June 25, 2010

Main Round (Group C)

June 25, 2010

June 26, 2010

Consolation round (Group D)

June 25, 2010

June 26, 2010

Placement matches
11th/12th position
June 27, 2010

9th/10th position
June 27, 2010

7th/8th position
June 27, 2010

5th/6th position
June 27, 2010

Finals

Semifinals
June 27, 2010

3rd/4th place
June 27, 2010

Final
June 27, 2010

References
Format & Rules

External links
Official Site
IHF Page

Beach World Championships
Beach Handball World Championships
Beach handball
Beach Handball World Championships
Sport in Antalya
21st century in Antalya